Daniela Anahi Bessia (born 9 July 1989) is an Italian-Argentine singer, actress, song composer and TV host.

She has been based in Shanghai, China from 2011 and moved to Italy in 2020.

She is best known for her performances on China Central Television and award winner of top ten "Shanghai Excellence Awards", awarded to expats who have made contributions to the city with more than 12 million online votes.

The international press has called Bessia "The Extraordinary Expat", for her contributions to the local cultural scene, and tell about Bessia's passionate and inspiring performances have entertained viewers and brought a deeper understanding of Argentine culture to Chinese people.

Career 
In 2011, she went to Shanghai. In Argentina, she appeared at many events, notably the China Ambassador Museum celebration. She received a full scholarship to study Chinese language and culture.

Filmography

Television   
She was invited to appear on Xianyan (China talent show). Afterwards, she appeared in Tonight Said Something and Oriental zhiboshi, among others. She was a special guest on Venus Mars Hit and on Shanghai Summer Charm and with the Shanghai Philharmonic orchestra. She appear on Jinshe Spring Festival Spring Festival Gala 2013 on Taiwan. She appeared on CCTV programs Gold 100 Seconds and Avenue of Stars.

Variety shows 
 Gold 100 Seconds
 Snake Spring Festival Spring Festival Gala 2013

Album 
In March 2014, Bessia recorded an album, a collection of all the songs she sang in China.

Discography
美食训练营 (2016)

References

1988 births
21st-century Argentine actresses
21st-century Argentine women singers
21st-century Italian actresses
21st-century Italian composers
21st-century Italian women singers
21st-century women composers
Living people
Singers from Buenos Aires
Argentine expatriates in China
Argentine tango musicians
Latin music record producers
Italian film actresses
Argentine film actresses
Argentine telenovela actresses
Italian television actresses
Argentine television actresses
Argentine pop singers
Italian pop singers
Italian female models
Argentine female models
Fashion influencers
China's Got Talent
China Global Television Network people
CCTV television presenters